ConnNet was a packet switched data network operated by the Southern New England Telephone Company serving the U.S. state of Connecticut.

ConnNet was the nation's first local public packet switching network when it was launched on March 11, 1985.  Users could access services such as Dow Jones News Retrieval, CompuServe,  Dialcom, GEnie, Delphi, Eaasy Sabre, NewsNet, PeopleLink, the National Library of Medicine, and BIX.  ConnNet could also be used to access other national and international packet networks, such as Tymnet and ACCUNET.  Large companies also connected their mainframe computers to ConnNet allowing employees access to the mainframes from home.  The network is no longer in operation.

Hardware
The X.25 network was based on hardware from Databit, Inc. consisting of three EDX-P Network Nodes that performed switching and were located in Hartford, New Haven and Stamford.  Databit also supplied 23 ANP 2520 Advanced Network Processors each of which provided the system with a point of presence, a network control center and modems.  Customers would order leased line connections into the network for host computers running at 4,800 to 56,000 bits per second (bit/s).  Terminals would connect over a leased line from 1,200 to 9,600 bit/s synchronous, 300 to 2,400 bit/s asynchronous or using dial-up connections from 300 to 1,200 bit/s.  The connection to Tymnet was established over an X.75 based 9,600 bit/s analog link from the ConnNet Hartford node to Tymnet's Bloomfield node.

See also
Southern New England Telephone (SNET)

References

 Southern New England Telephone (Mar 13, 1985). SNET; Offers its Connecticut customers the first local packet switched data network in the nation. Press Release
 ConnNet Online Help.  Accessed Jan 07, 1991
 AT&T (Jan 29, 1986). Untitled.  Press Release
 SNET / Packet/PC (Nov 12, 1987). PC users can link to IBM mainframes with Packet/ PC software and SNET's Connect.  Press Release
 Scully, Sharon (June 2, 1986). "Protocol Conversion; SNET heralds services".  Network World, p 4.
 Databit (May 27, 1986). DATABIT; Announces point-of-sale terminal application with Southern New England Telephone.  Press Release
 Strauss, Paul R.  (Jan 1 1987).  "Feature 1986: Information networking's quiet watershed year in review".  Data Communications, p 169.

1985 establishments in Connecticut
Communications in Connecticut
History of the Internet